Robert Curtis (November 7, 1933 - March 7, 2021) was an American former politician in the state of Washington. He served the 12th district from 1971 to 1977.

References

2021 deaths
1933 births
Republican Party members of the Washington House of Representatives
Businesspeople from Washington (state)
People from Wenatchee, Washington